Kastriot Rexha (born 27 November 1989), known professionally as Majk or Dr. Mic, is a Kosovo-Albanian rapper.

Life and career

1989–2005: Early life and career beginnings 

Kastriot Rexha was born on 27 November 1989 into an Albanian family in the city of Pristina, then part of the Socialist Federal Republic of Yugoslavia, present Kosovo. He started as a member of the rap duo Team 10 along with Kosovo-Albanian rapper Onat. After releasing their first album, 17 Arsye, the group split in 2009.

Discography

Singles

As lead artist

References 

1989 births
Living people
Albanian-language singers
21st-century Albanian rappers
Kosovo Albanians
Kosovan rappers
Musicians from Pristina